Pravitto Raju (born 25 April 1997) is an Indian professional footballer who plays as a midfielder for Mumbai Kenkre in the I-League.

Career 
Pravitto kicked off his football career, playing for RBI in the first division during his college days. He played an instrumental role in earning RBI their promotion to the senior division football league. At the end of the season, it was Indian Bank Recreational Club assistant coach Noel, who spotted his talent and signed him on at the club. Pravitto then went on to succeed at his new club, scoring nine goals that helped Indian Bank to put an end to a trophy draught.

He made his professional debut for the Chennai City F.C. against Churchill Brothers on 1 November 2018, He was brought in the 72nd minute as Chennai City drew 1–1.

Career statistics

Club

References

1997 births
Living people
People from Nagercoil
Indian footballers
Chennai City FC players  
Footballers from Tamil Nadu
I-League players
Association football midfielders